Three Chute Falls (also known as Hidden Falls or Tenaya Creek Falls) is a waterfall on Tenaya Creek in Yosemite National Park, in the U.S. state of California.

The waterfall is located in lower Tenaya Canyon, around a half mile upstream from Mirror Lake. The name is from the three distinct "chutes" that the creek splits into upon flowing onto a slab of granite atop the falls, after which it plunges about  into a congregation of boulders.

Access
The falls are easily reached by proceeding upstream along the Mirror Lake Trail. They are relatively obscure, and the trail requires some scrambling.

Further upstream is the much larger,  Pywiack Cascade of Tenaya Creek.

References 

 Shaffer, Chris. A Definitive Guide To Waterfalls of Central and Southern California. Shafdog Publications, 2005.

Waterfalls of Yosemite National Park
Waterfalls of Mariposa County, California
Plunge waterfalls